The South Korean boyband BtoB has performed in two concert tours, seventeen concerts and four fan meetings since debut in 2012. They have also held five special concerts, I'll Be Your Melody in conjunction with the theme of their album released each year. The concert is filled with special performances of published and unpublished songs.

Tours

BTOB Zepp Tour 2016 B-Loved

Tour dates

Set list
{{hidden
| headercss = background: #42B4E6; font-size: 100%; width: 80%;
| contentcss = text-align: left; font-size: 100%; width: 80%;
| header = 
| content =
Opening VCR
 MAGIC Time
 Blowin'

Ment
  Beep Beep
 Giddy Up

Ment
  Way Back Home
 It's Okay
 Repeating Goodbye

VCR
  Rainy Blue 
 A-Yo 
 Uptown Funk (Mark Ronson and Bruno Mars cover) 

Ment
  I'll Be Here 
 Neverland 

VCR ft. Dear Bride
  Dear Bride

Ment
  Always & Forever
 Sky's Tears

Ment
  WOW (Jpn. Ver.)
 All Wolves Except Me

Ment
  Future (Tomorrow)
 Second Confession (Jpn Ver.)
 Because We Can Meet Again

 Encore
  Hello
 Shake It

}}

BTOB Zepp Tour『BTOB TIME JAPAN』

Tour dates

Set list
{{hidden
| headercss = background: #42B4E6; font-size: 100%; width: 80%;
| contentcss = text-align: left; font-size: 100%; width: 80%;
| header = 
| content =
VCR 1
 New Men
 Pray (I'll Be Your Man)
 Thriller

Ment
 MAGIC Time
 Beep Beep

Ment
 Cherry Blossom Color /Remember That 
 Always and Forever /L.U.V. /Sky's Tears / Repeating Goodbye 

Ment
 About Time
 Love Drunk /Killing Me 
 Killing Me /Let's Kiss Right Here, Right Now 

VCR
 Stand By Me 
 Hello Mello (JPN ver.) 

Ment
 Future (Tomorrow)
 Dear Bride /Second Confession (JPN ver.) 

Ment
 MOVIE /Dear Bride 
 Second Confession (JPN ver.) /MOVIE 
 
Ment
 Someday
 Because We Will Meet Again

VCR 6
 WOW (JPN ver.) /All Wolves Except Me 
 Shake It

 Encore
 Yes I Am
 Blowin'
 Hello 

  Song performed on April 1-2.
  Song performed on April 9.
  Song performed on April 8.
  Song performed on April 15-16.
}}

Concerts

Happy Summer Vacation with BtoB

1st concert: Hello Melody

Hello Melody is the first solo concert held, respectively in 2014 and 2015 in South Korea, Seoul and Busan.

Summary
On September 19, 2014, Cube Entertainment announced through its official SNS that BtoB will held its first solo concert "Hello, Melody" at the Olympic Hall in Seoul, South Korea on October 31 and November 1. Jung Il-hoon invited his sister JOO as a special guest.
On March 11, 2015, Cube announced the date for "Hello Melody in Busan".

Set list
{{hidden
| headercss = background: #42B4E6; font-size: 100%; width: 80%;
| contentcss = text-align: left; font-size: 100%; width: 80%;
| header = 
| content =
Opening VCR
 WOW
 Thriller

Ment
 Beep Beep
 Happening

VCR
 You're So Fly

Ment
 Broken Heart
 Hope You're Doing Fine
 Insane 

VCR
 Born To Beat  
 Love More + Body Shots (Chris Brown cover) 
 Irresistible Lips 
 When I Was Your Man (내가 니 남자였을 때 )

Ment
 I Don't Know  
 You're My Angel 

Ment
 Love 
 Jung Il-hoon solo piano stage
 Do You Know Who I Am? (허타 이즈 백 Heota is Back) 

VCR
 Please (Lee Sora cover)  
 Like That Day (그때 그날처럼) 

VCR
 Gentlemen (Psy cover) 
 Lover Boy

Ment

VCR
 Star
 Never Ending (Melody) (Vocal line cover) 

Ment
 Hello Mello (Rap line cover) 
 Shake It

Encore
 Second Confession
 Catch Me
 Hello
}}

{{hidden
| headercss = background: #42B4E6; font-size: 100%; width: 80%;
| contentcss = text-align: left; font-size: 100%; width: 80%;
| header = 
| content =
Opening VCR
 WOW
 Thriller

Ment
 Beep Beep
 Happening

VCR
 <li value="5">You're So Fly

Ment
 <li value="6">Broken Heart
 One Sip
 Insane 

VCR
 <li value="9"> Born To Beat  
 Love More + Body Shots (Chris Brown cover) 
 Irresistible Lips
 Lover Boy

Ment
 <li value="13">I Don’t Know 
 You’re My Angel (넌 나의 천사)  
 A-yo 
 Uptown Funk (Mark Ronson and Bruno Mars cover) 

VCR
 <li value="17"> Etude of Memory (Kim Dong Ryul cover)  
 Like That Day (그때 그날처럼) 

VCR
 <li value="19"> Gentlemen (Psy cover) 
 The Winter's Tale

VCR
 <li value="21"> Star
 Never Ending (Melody) (Vocal line cover) 

Ment
 <li value="23">Hello Mello (Rap line cover) 
 Shake It

Encore
 <li value="25"> Catch Me
 Hello
}}

Concert dates

Media

Personnel
Organizer: Cube Entertainment 
Ticketing partners: INTERPARK

1st solo concert: 'The Secret Diary'

Set list

BtoB 2015 Concert in Hong Kong

Set list

2nd concert: Born to Beat Time

Media

Set list

Born To Beat Time ~ Encore

Set list

Born To Beat Time Concert in Taiwan

Set list

3rd concert: BtoB Time

BtoB Time is the third solo concert of boy band, BtoB. The concert commenced with two shows in Seoul and continued with concerts in Taiwan and Hong Kong.

Set list

Concert dates

Media

Personnel
Organizers: Cube Entertainment, Asscott Media (Taiwan), K Contents Hub Co. Limited. (Hong Kong) 
Ticketing partners: Hanatour (Seoul), KKTIX (Taiwan), HK Ticketing (Hong Kong)

4th concert: BtoB Time – Our Concert

Set list

Concert dates

Media

5th Concert: BtoB Time – This Is Us

Set list

Concert dates

Media

BtoB 4U Online Concert: INSIDE

Set list

6th Concert: 2022 BTOB Time – Be Together (BTOB 10th Anniversary Concert)

Concert dates

Set list

Special concerts

I'll Be Your Melody

Concert participations
  2013 United Cube Concert : Nanjing, China (January 26), Seoul, South Korea (February 2), and Yokohama, Japan (February 21)
 Boys To Man  (29 June 2013)
 BesTV Channel-M Cube Festival  (30 September 2015)
 United Cube Concert – One  (16 June 2018)
 U & Cube Festival 2019 in Japan  (23 March 2019)

Showcases

Others

Notes

References

External links

B
B
B
B
B
C